Lappeenranta-Lahti University of Technology LUT (Finnish: Lappeenrannan-Lahden teknillinen yliopisto LUT), better known by the abbreviation LUT University (Finnish: LUT-yliopisto) is a Finnish public research university which was established in 1969. The university's Lappeenranta campus is situated on the shore of lake Saimaa – the 4th largest lake in Europe. LUT University's second campus is in the Finnish city of Lahti. The university also has research units in the Finnish cities of Mikkeli and Kouvola, as well as a regional office in Brussels, Belgium.

LUT University is a University of Technology, meaning that the institution specializes its academics and research in the fields of engineering and technology. The university also has a school of business and a department of social sciences. LUT University specializes in renewable technology, clean water and energy, combatting climate change and finding sustainable engineering solutions.

There are 1,089 staff members and 6,331 students in the university. About 5,000 students reside in the larger Lappeenranta campus area, and the Lahti campus hosts around 1,000 students.

LUT University is operated and funded by the Finnish government. LUT University is a part of the LUT-Universities Group. The group also operates the LAB University of Applied Sciences which shares a campus with LUT University. LUT University focuses on academic, theoretical, and research oriented subjects, while LAB University of Applied Sciences focuses on practical and career-oriented teaching.

History in brief
Combining technology and business, LUT University (in Finnish Lappeenrannan teknillinen korkeakoulu (LTKK) until 2003, Lappeenrannan teknillinen yliopisto (LTY) until 2019, changed to Lappeenrannan-Lahden teknillinen yliopisto LUT (LUT-yliopisto)) has served as an academic forerunner since 1969. In the 1950s and 1960s, the Finnish government made plans to establish the University of Eastern Finland in Lappeenranta, but it was ultimately decentralized in three cities: Lappeenranta, Kuopio, and Joensuu. Only the departments of engineering were located in Lappeenranta at that time. In 1991, the department of Business Administration was also added to the Lappeenranta Campus.

The Kuopio and Joensuu campuses were combined into the University of Eastern Finland in 2010, while LUT University kept its Lappeenranta campus as well as its previously added operations in Lahti and the Lahti campus.

LUT University started permanent operations Lahti in 1996. After LUT University's second campus opened in 2019, the university requested a change to the Finnish Universities Act to change names from Lappeenranta University of Technology to Lappeenranta-Lahti University of Technology LUT, not only keeping the LUT abbreviation but officially adding it to the full name of the institution. This request was accepted by the Finnish government, and from then on the name LUT was used less as an abbreviation but rather a descriptive name for the university, leading to the abbreviation name change to LUT University.

The LUT-Universities Group was formed when LUT University acquired and combined Lahti University of Applied Sciences and Saimaa University of Applied Sciences into LAB University of Applied Sciences. This enables students of LUT University to take courses from an applied sciences perspective as well if they wish, expanding study opportunities for students in fields like languages.

LUT University began their first English bachelor's program of Technology and Engineering Science in 2019, allowing students a multidisciplinary opportunity for engineering education in Finland.

In 2020, the university negotiated a joint contract with Chinese Hebei University of Technology (HEBUT) to offer English based bachelor's programs in both the Lappeenranta and Lahti campuses.

Lappeenranta Campus 
LUT University's Lappeenranta campus is the original and largest campus of LUT University. The campus is located off from the city center of Lappeenranta in the district of Skinnarila. The campus is open round-the-clock and students have access to campus resources such as the academic library and gym at all times. The campus also has the Jamie Hyneman Center (JHC), named after LUT University's professor of practice Jamie Hyneman, who is known for the show Mythbusters. Most of LUT University's research and laboratories are located in the Lappeenranta campus.

The Lappeenranta campus is connected to the campus of LAB University of Applied Sciences' Lappeenranta campus via a skybridge. LAB students have access to LUT's academic library and other portions of the LUT building, while LUT students have access to LAB spaces such as the sports hall. Overall, the campus houses 8,500 students among LUT University and LAB University of Applied Sciences, and combined with other experts and companies on campus the campus population exceeds 10,000.

Each program at LUT University has their own unique guild and guild room. Incoming students can expect an alive and vibrant student life. The Lappeenranta campus is known for holding the world's longest Vappu, normally a one-day celebration in Finland which in Lappeenranta lasts between three and four weeks each year.

Each guild of LUT in Lappeenranta has their own specially colored overalls which distinguish them in student events. Overall colors are as follows:

It should also be noted that Erasmus Student Network Lappeenranta, while not a guild, still partakes in the overall tradition by supplying exchange students with blue overalls.

Each year, first year students get "baptized" typically in Lake Saimaa, and become first year students. Students get baptized a second time during Vappu to become a "Teekkari" student, meaning a Technology and Engineering Student, or "Kylteri" student, meaning business student.

The Lappeenranta campus generally has the majority of LUT University's student events and traditions, and because of that has the most alive student culture of LUT University.

The Lappeenranta campus has a large variety of restaurants, cafes, and bars. This includes the student union owned YOLO restaurant and IVH campus restaurant. Inside the university there is a campus shop, Cafe, Buffet, Pizza restaurant, and Indian food restaurant. There is a restaurant and cafe inside the LAB University of Applied sciences connected to LUT through a skybridge, and there is also a bar that is near student housing on campus. The student union building also has a grocery store students can use to buy essentials.

Lahti Campus 

LUT University's second campus is located in the Finnish city of Lahti. The Lahti campus shares a space with LAB University of Applied Sciences' Lahti campus. The campus is located inside a renovated factory, of which a portion belongs to the universities, but is also shared among various companies and institutes. While operations in Lahti were started in 1996, the campus itself is very new. Because of this, the campus is still forming and a variety of features and offerings of the Lappeenranta campus are not yet present in Lahti.

The Lahti campus shares some of the student traditions of guilds and colored student overalls, and has many of the same features to the Lappeenranta campus, but at a smaller scale. The campus has been steadily growing and new programs and features are added consistently. With LAB University of Applied Sciences, the Lahti campus has about 6,000 students, of which about 1,000 are LUT students. About half of LUT University's international programs in English are located on the Lahti campus. The campus also has a large amount of Finnish master's programs relating to commercial science and engineering. Because of this, the student population of the Lahti campus largely consists of master's level students.

The Lahti campus hosts the Aether guild, which is responsible for international students in the Lahti campus.

While other universities like the University of Helsinki have had higher education opportunities in Lahti, LUT University and LAB University of Applied Sciences are the currently the only schools of higher education in the area with an extensive list of study subjects, making it a choice for those who want to study and live near the city of Lahti.

The Lahti campus has two restaurants and cafes for students to enjoy. The campus also has a small section of the university academic library.

LUT Regional Units 
The Mikkeli research unit opened in 2002, and currently has five professors working with groups of research students. The research unit focuses on research and doctoral studies. The current research in Mikkeli centers on climate issues.

The Kouvola research unit has also been operational since 2002, and is focusing on research relating to technology and business, as well as railway logistics. The research unit houses the innovation logistics master's program.

The Brussels regional office exists to strengthen the university's cooperation with its European partners.

Degrees, Reputations and Rankings 
LUT awards the following degrees: Bachelor of Science (Economics), Bachelor of Science (Technology), Master of Science (Economics), Master of Science (Technology), Licentiate of Science (Economics), Licentiate of Science (Technology), Doctor of Science (Technology), Doctor of Science (Economics), and Doctor of Philosophy.

LUT University has been ranked in the top 5 Finnish Universities in the 2023 QS Top 500 Universities list, and is in the top 3% of Universities globally. The university is ranked second in Finland in the fields of Physical Sciences and Business., and fifth in Engineering.

LUT has steadily risen in global and domestic prestige, being ranked in the world's 20 most rapidly developing challenger universities. LUT was also ranked the 9th best University on the globe for climate action. The university has further been ranked in the Times Higher Education's Top 20 world's best small universities list.

LUT University has internationally accredited Master's programs. Master's degree program in International Marketing Management was awarded EFMD's EPAS-accreditation. EUR-ACE and ASIIN-accredited programs LUT University has are in Chemical Engineering, Energy Technology, Environmental Technology, Mechanical Engineering, Electrical Engineering and in Industrial Management.

In the year 2022, LUT University received 4,196 domestic applicants, and accepted 620 new students. This puts LUT University's domestic acceptance rate at 15%.

The overall reputation of LUT University has been steadily rising due to consistent improvements in research and academics at the university.

Organisation

Board
 Chairman Teresa Kemppi-Vasama, Chairman of Kemppi Oy
 Pia Erkinheimo Director, Finnish Climate Fund
 Kimmo Rauma, Vice President, Danfoss Power Solutions, Electrics
 Olli Rehn Governor and chairman of the board, Bank of Finland
 Liisa Rohweder, Secretary General, WWF Finland
 Juhani Hyvärinen, Professor, LUT
 Ahti Jaatinen-Värri, Associate Professor, LUT
 Paavo Ritala, Professor, LUT
 Henna Raekorpi, Business student, LUT

Rectors
 Rector D.Sc. (B.A.) Juha-Matti Saksa
 Vice Rector (Research) Jari Hämäläinen, PhD, Professor
 Vice Rector (Education) Jaana Sandström D.Sc. (Tech.), Professor

International University 

LUT University is called Finland's International University due to the high amount of international programs and students that are attending the university. Over 15% of LUT University's student population is international and the school has a representation of 94 different nationalities

Over 92% of international students were happy with their experience studying at LUT University specifically in Lappeenranta. 

Lappeenranta, the city of LUT University's largest campus, is also known as a welcoming international city.

International Programs 
Finnish speakers can study a variety of programs in business, engineering and social sciences, and LUT also offers six different international Bachelor's programs in English:

Bachelor's Programs in Technology [English] 

 Electrical Engineering* (Lappeenranta Campus)
 Mechanical Engineering* (Lappeenranta Campus)
 Technology and Engineering Science (Lappeenranta Campus)
 Energy Technology* (Lahti Campus)
 Industrial Engineering and Management (Lahti Campus)
 Software Systems and Engineering* (Lahti Campus)

Bachelor's programs marked with a * are double degree programs, where the student will receive a diploma from LUT University, as well as LUT University's partner university, Hebei University of Technology in China given that they meet the degree requirements for both universities.

Technology and Engineering Science (Bachelor of Science - Technology) 
LUT University's first English bachelor's program was the program of Technology and Engineering Science, where students learn a variety of skills relating to energy technology, environmental technology, mechanical engineering, and electrical engineering. Students will choose a main subject to specialize in which they have the right to continue onto master's studies. This is particularly helpful in areas of business and engineering where it is preferable to have skills relating to multiple different fields of engineering. The program's belief is that graduates that can combine skills of various different fields of engineering can find solutions to difficult problems in efficient and innovative ways that are better for the environment and more profitable for companies.

Hebei University of Technology Programs (Bachelor of Science - Technology) 
LUT University is partnered with Hebei University of Technology (HEBUT) to offer various English based bachelor's programs in Engineering sciences. The graduates of the programs receive a diploma from both LUT University and HEBUT. Students in the program become familiar with engineering relating to Finland, the European Union, and China. The goal of the program is to train engineers that have the knowledge and familiarity to work in international environments and find solutions to difficult problems that require international understanding and participation from all over the world. The current bachelor's programs offered in partnership with HEBUT are Mechanical Engineering, Electrical Engineering, Software Systems and Design, and Energy Technology.

Master's Programs in Technology [English] 

 Biorefineries (Lappeenranta Campus)
 Chemical Engineering (Lappeenranta Campus)
 Water Technology (Mikkeli Research Unit)
 Sustainable Biomass and Bioproduct Engineering (Lappeenranta Campus)
 Business analytics, Engineering Science (Lappeenranta Campus)
 Data-Centric Engineering (Lappeenranta Campus)
 Technical Physics (Lappeenranta Campus)
 Electric Transportation Systems (Lahti Campus)
 Electrical Engineering (Lappeenranta Campus)
 Sustainable Energy Systems (Lappeenranta Campus)
 Energy Conversion (Lappeenranta Campus)
 Nuclear Engineering (Lappeenranta Campus)
 Sustainability Science and Solutions (Lappeenranta Campus)
 Circular Economy (Lahti campus)
 Global Management of Innovation and Technology (Lappeenranta Campus)
 Innovation and Logistics (Kouvola Research Unit)
 Industrial Design Engineering (Lahti Campus)
 Materials Science and Technology (Lappeenranta Campus)
 Mechanical Engineering (Lappeenranta Campus)
 Digital Systems and Service Development (Lahti Campus)
 Software Engineering and Digital Transformation (Lappeenranta Campus)
 Software Product Management and Business (Lahti campus)
 Sustainable ICT Solutions of Tomorrow (Lappeenranta Campus)
 Software Engineers for Green Deal (Lappeenranta Campus)

Programs in Business Administration [English] 
As of 2022, LUT University does not offer international bachelor's programs in Business and Economics.

The following programs LUT offers in English are master's level programs.
 International Business and Entrepreneurship (Lappeenranta Campus)
 Business Analytics (Lappeenranta Campus)
 International Marketing and Management (Lappeenranta Campus)
 Strategic Finance and Analytics (Lappeenranta Campus)
 Supply Management (Lappeenranta Campus)

Programs in Social Sciences 
As of now, LUT does not offer its Social Sciences programs in English, but has suggested that the programs will be announced in the year 2023.

Schools and Departments 

At the beginning of 2015, the university shifted to an organization model which does not have traditional faculties and departments. Instead, the university consists of three distinct schools which focus on the following research topics:

LUT School of Energy Systems
Energy Technology
Electrical Engineering
Sustainability Science
Mechanical Engineering

LUT School of Engineering Science 
Chemical Engineering
Computational Engineering and Physics
Industrial Engineering and Management
Software Engineering and Digital Transformation

LUT School of Business and Management
Strategy, Management and Accounting
International Business, Marketing and Entrepreneurship
 Business Analytics and Data Science

Research Institutes 
 Centre for Separation Technology (CST)
 Carelian Drives and Motor Centre (CDMC)
 Centre of Computational Engineering and Integrated Design (CEID)

The Viipuri Prize
The Viipuri Prize, established by the Society for Viipuri School of Economics, is awarded for outstanding achievements in the field of strategy research. The Prize is given every second year to a scholar who is among the most prominent in his or her field of study on a global scale, and whose work powerfully affects the research agenda at LUT School of Business.

The following scholars have been awarded the Viipuri Prize:
David Teece, University of California, Berkeley (2003)
James G. March, Stanford University (2004)
Peter Buckley, University of Leeds (2006)
Sidney G. Winter, University of Pennsylvania (2008)
C. K. Prahalad, University of Michigan (2010)
John Kay, London School of Economics (2012)
Constance E. Helfat, Tuck School of Business (2014)
Rebecca M. Henderson, Harvard Business School (2017)
Erik Brynjolfsson, Massachusetts Institute of Technology (2019)
Henry Chesbrough, University of California Berkeley (2022)

Rectors 
 Viljo Immonen, 1969 – 1970
 Erkki Kinnunen, 1971 – 1975
 Niilo Teeri, 1975 – 1977
 Juhani Jaakkola
 Markku Lukka, 1998 – 2008
 Ilkka Pöyhönen, 2008 – 2014
 Anneli Pauli, 2014 – 2016
 Juha-Matti Saksa, 2016–Present

See also 

 LAB University of Applied Sciences
 Hebei University of Technology
 List of universities in Finland

References

External links

 Official site
 LUT Student Union

Technical universities and colleges in Finland
Universities and colleges in Finland
Educational institutions established in 1969
1969 establishments in Finland